The 2012 Boyd Tinsley Women's Clay Court Classic was a professional tennis tournament played on clay courts. It was the tenth edition of the tournament which was part of the 2012 ITF Women's Circuit. It took place in Charlottesville, Virginia, United States between 23 and 29 April 2012.

WTA entrants

Seeds

 1 Rankings are as of April 16, 2012.

Other entrants
The following players received wildcards into the singles main draw:
  Lindsey Hardenbergh
  Melanie Oudin
  Shelby Rogers
  Maria Sanchez

The following players received entry from the qualifying draw:
  Gail Brodsky
  Alexandra Kiick
  Chalena Scholl
  Roxane Vaisemberg

The following players received entry by a lucky loser spot:
  Julie Coin
  Julia Glushko
  Johanna Konta

Champions

Singles

 Melanie Oudin def.  Irina Falconi, 7–6(7–0), 3–6, 6–1

Doubles

 Maria Sanchez /  Yasmin Schnack def.  Elena Bovina /  Julia Glushko, 6–2, 6–2

External links
ITF Search
Official Website

Boyd Tinsley Women's Clay Court Classic